Gryaznushka is a rural locality (a selo) in Mikhaylovsky Selsoviet of Blagoveshchensky District, Amur Oblast, Russia. The population was 319 as of 2018. There are 5 streets.

Geography 
Gryaznushka is located on the bank of the Gryaznushka River, 62 km north of Blagoveshchensk (the district's administrative centre) by road. Mikhaylovka is the nearest rural locality.

References 

Rural localities in Blagoveshchensky District, Amur Oblast